David Lane is a British television and film director, best known for his association with series produced by Gerry Anderson's AP Films.

Lane directed several episodes of Thunderbirds (1965–66), including "Attack of the Alligators!", as well as the two films Thunderbirds Are Go (1966) and Thunderbird 6 (1968). He also worked on Anderson's other series up to UFO (1970–71) and Gerry Anderson's New Captain Scarlet (2005), and would go on to collaborate with Anderson stalwart Derek Meddings on several other projects including Superman (1978).

In 2006, he co-founded a new production company, Pineapple Squared Entertainment, with former Thomas the Tank Engine & Friends director David Mitton and Michele Fabian Jones. Lane worked on the CGI adventure series Adventures on Orsum Island until Mitton's death in 2008, at which time production was discontinued.

Lane and Fabian Jones, a long-term business partner, founded the company Lane Fabian Jones, of which Lane was a director.

References

External links

British company founders
British film directors
British television directors
Living people
Place of birth missing (living people)
Year of birth missing (living people)